The Corpus Juris (or Iuris) Civilis ("Body of Civil Law") is the modern name for a collection of fundamental works in jurisprudence, issued from 529 to 534 by order of Justinian I, Byzantine Emperor. It is also sometimes referred to metonymically after one of its parts, the Code of Justinian.

The work as planned had three parts: the Code (Codex) is a compilation, by selection and extraction, of imperial enactments to date; the Digest or Pandects (the Latin title contains both Digesta and Pandectae) is an encyclopedia composed of mostly brief extracts from the writings of Roman jurists; and the Institutes (Institutiones) is a student textbook, mainly introducing the Code, although it has important conceptual elements that are less developed in the Code or the Digest. All three parts, even the textbook, were given force of law. They were intended to be, together, the sole source of law; reference to any other source, including the original texts from which the Code and the Digest had been taken, was forbidden. Nonetheless, Justinian found himself having to enact further laws and today these are counted as a fourth part of the Corpus, the Novellae Constitutiones (Novels, literally New Laws).

The work was directed by Tribonian, an official in Justinian's court in Constantinople. His team was authorized to edit what they included. How far they made amendments is not recorded and, in the main, cannot be known because most of the originals have not survived. The text was composed and distributed almost entirely in Latin, which was still the official language of the government of the Eastern Roman Empire in 529–534, whereas the prevalent language of merchants, farmers, seamen, and other citizens was Greek. By the early 7th century, Greek had largely replaced Latin as the dominant language of the empire.

The Corpus Juris Civilis was revised into Greek, when that became the predominant language of the Eastern Roman Empire, and continued to form the basis of the empire's laws, the Basilika (Greek: τὰ βασιλικά, 'imperial laws'), through the 15th century. The Basilika in turn served as the basis for local legal codes in the Balkans during the following Ottoman period and later formed the basis of the legal code of Modern Greece. In Western Europe, the Corpus Juris Civilis, or its successor texts like the Basilika, did not get well established originally and was only recovered in the Middle Ages, being "received" or imitated as private law. Its public law content was quarried for arguments by both secular and ecclesiastical authorities. This recovered Roman law, in turn, became the foundation of law in all civil law jurisdictions. The provisions of the Corpus Juris Civilis also influenced the canon law of the Catholic Church: it was said that ecclesia vivit lege romana – the church lives by Roman law. Its influence on common law legal systems has been much smaller, although some basic concepts from the Corpus have survived through Norman law – such as the contrast, especially in the Institutes, between "law" (statute) and custom. The Corpus continues to have a major influence on public international law. Its four parts thus constitute the foundation documents of the Western legal tradition.

Compilation process

Justinian acceded to the imperial throne in Constantinople in 527. Six months after his accession, in order to reduce the great number of imperial constitutions and thus also the number of court proceedings, Justinian arranged for the creation of a new collection of imperial constitutions (Codex Iustinianus). The commission in charge of the compilation process was explicitly authorized to leave out or change text and to delete what was obsolete or contradictory. Soon, in 529, the Codex was completed and was conferred the force of law in the whole empire, replacing all earlier constitutions and the Codex Theodosianus.

A little more than a year after the enactment of the first edition of the Code, Justinian appointed a commission headed by Tribonian to compile the traditional jurists' law in a new, shortened and contemporary codification: the 'Digest or Pandects'. The traditional collection of jurists' law, Justinian believed, was so extensive that it had become unmanageable, necessitating a new compilation. The commission completed its work within three years, in 533.

Tribonian's commission surveyed the works of classical jurists who were assumed in Justinian's time to have the authority to clarify law (ius respondendi) and whose works were still available. In total, there are excerpts from 38 jurists in the Digest.

The four parts

Codex
 
The "Codex Justinianus", "Codex Justinianeus" or "Codex Justiniani" (Latin for "Justinian's Code") was the first part to be finished, on 7 April 529. It contained in Latin most of the existing imperial constitutiones (imperial pronouncements having force of law), back to the time of Hadrian. It used both the Codex Theodosianus and the fourth-century collections embodied in the Codex Gregorianus and Codex Hermogenianus, which provided the model for division into books that were themselves divided into titles. These works had developed authoritative standing. This first edition is now lost; a second edition was issued in 534 and is the text that has survived. At least the second edition contained some of Justinian's own legislation, including some legislation in Greek. It is not known whether he intended there to be further editions, although he did envisage translation of Latin enactments into Greek.

Legislation about religion
Numerous provisions served to secure the status of Christianity as the state religion of the empire, uniting Church and state, and making anyone who was not connected to the Christian church a non-citizen. The Christianity referred to is Chalcedonian Christianity as defined by the state church, which excluded a variety of other major Christian sects in existence at the time such as the Church of the East and Oriental Orthodoxy.

Laws against heresy
The very first law in the Codex requires all persons under the jurisdiction of the Empire to hold the Christian faith. This was primarily aimed at heresies such as Nestorianism. This text later became the springboard for discussions of international law, especially the question of just what persons are under the jurisdiction of a given state or legal system.

Laws against paganism
Other laws, while not aimed at pagan belief as such, forbid particular pagan practices. For example, it is provided that all persons present at a pagan sacrifice may be indicted as if for murder.

Digesta

The Digesta or Pandectae, completed in 533, is a collection of juristic writings, mostly dating back to the second and third centuries. Fragments were taken out of various legal treatises and opinions and inserted in the Digest. In their original context, the statements of the law contained in these fragments were just private opinions of legal scholars – although some juristic writings had been privileged by Theodosius II's Law of Citations in 426. The Digest, however, was given full force of law.

Institutions

As the Digest neared completion, Tribonian and two professors, Theophilus and Dorotheus, made a student textbook, called the Institutions or Elements. As there were four elements, the manual consists of four books. The Institutiones are largely based on the Institutiones of Gaius. Two-thirds of the Institutiones of Justinian consists of literal quotes from Gaius. The new Institutiones were used as a manual for jurists in training from 21 November 533 and were given the authority of law on 30 December 533 along with the Digest.

Novellae

The Novellae consisted of new laws that were passed after 534. They were later re-worked into the Syntagma, a practical lawyer's edition, by Athanasios of Emesa during the years 572–577.

Continuation in the East
The term Byzantine Empire is used today to refer to what remained of the Roman Empire in the Eastern Mediterranean following the collapse of the Empire in the West. This Eastern empire continued to practice Roman Law, and it was as the ruler of this empire that Justinian formalized Roman law in his Corpus Juris Civilis. To account for the language shift of the Empire's administration from Latin to Greek legal codes based on the Corpus Juris Civilis were enacted in Greek. The most well known are: 
 the Ecloga (740) – enacted by emperor Leo the Isaurian;
 the Prochiron and Epanagoge (c. 879) – enacted by emperor Basil the Macedonian; and 
 the Basilika (late 9th century) – started by Basil the Macedonian and finished by his son emperor Leo the Wise. 
The Basilika was a complete adaptation of Justinian's codification. At 60 volumes it proved to be difficult for judges and lawyers to use. There was need for a short and handy version. This was finally made by Constantine Harmenopoulos, a Byzantine judge from Thessaloniki, in 1345. He made a short version of Basilika in six books, called Hexabiblos. This was widely used throughout the Balkans during the following Ottoman period, and along with the Basilika was used as the first legal code for the newly independent Greek state in the 1820s. Serbian state, law and culture was built on the foundations of Rome and Byzantium. Therefore, the most important Serbian legal codes: Zakonopravilo (1219) and Dušan's Code (1349 and 1354), transplanted Romano-Byzantine Law included in Corpus Juris Civilis, Prohiron and Basilika. These Serbian codes were practised until the Serbian Despotate fell to the Turkish Ottoman Empire in 1459. After the liberation from the Turks in the Serbian Revolution, Serbs continued to practise Roman Law by enacting Serbian civil code in 1844. It was a short version of Austrian civil code (called Allgemeines bürgerliches Gesetzbuch), which was made on the basis of Corpus Juris Civilis.

Recovery in the West

Justinian's Corpus Juris Civilis was distributed in the West and went into effect in those areas regained under Justinian's wars of reconquest (Pragmatic Sanction of 554), including the Exarchate of Ravenna. Accordingly, the Institutes were made the textbook at the law school in Rome, and later in Ravenna when the school relocated there. However, after the loss of most of these areas, only the Catepanate (southern Italy) maintained a Byzantine legal tradition, but there the Corpus was superseded by the Ecloga and Basilika. Only the Corpus'''s provisions regulating the church still had any effect, but the Catholic church's de facto autonomy and the Great Schism made even that irrelevant. In Western Europe, the Corpus may have spurred a slew of Romano-Germanic law codes in the successor Germanic kingdoms, but these were heavily based on the older Theodosian Code, not the Corpus.

Historians disagree on the precise way the Corpus was recovered in Northern Italy about 1070: legal studies were undertaken on behalf of papal authority central to the Gregorian Reform of Pope Gregory VII, which may have led to its accidental rediscovery. Aside from the Littera Florentina (a complete 6th-century copy of the Digest preserved in Amalfi and later moved to Pisa) and the Epitome Codicis (c. 1050; incomplete manuscript preserving most of the Codex), there may have been other manuscript sources for the text that began to be taught at Bologna, by Pepo and then by Irnerius. Irnerius' technique was to read a passage aloud, which permitted his students to copy it, then to deliver an excursus explaining and illuminating Justinian's text, in the form of glosses. Irnerius' pupils, the so-called Four Doctors of Bologna, were among the first of the "glossators" who established the curriculum of medieval Roman law. The tradition was carried on by French lawyers, known as the Ultramontani, in the 13th century.

The merchant classes of Italian communes required law with a concept of equity, and law that covered situations inherent in urban life better than the primitive Germanic oral traditions. The provenance of the Code appealed to scholars who saw in the Holy Roman Empire a revival of venerable precedents from the classical heritage. The new class of lawyers staffed the bureaucracies that were beginning to be required by the princes of Europe. The University of Bologna, where Justinian's Code was first taught, remained the dominant centre for the study of law through the High Middle Ages.

A two-volume edition of the Digest was published in Paris in 1549 and 1550, translated by Antonio Agustín, Bishop of Tarragona, who was well known for other legal works. The full title of the Digest was Digestorum Seu Pandectarum tomus alter, and it was published by "Apud Carolam Guillards". Vol. 1 of the Digest has 2934 pages, while Vol. 2 has 2754 pages. Referring to Justinian's Code as Corpus Juris Civilis was only adopted in the 16th century, when it was printed in 1583 by Dionysius Gothofredus under this title. The legal thinking behind the Corpus Juris Civilis served as the backbone of the single largest legal reform of the modern age, the Napoleonic Code, which marked the abolition of feudalism, but reinstated slavery in the French Caribbean. Napoleon, as he waged total war on Europe, wanted to see these principles introduced to the whole of Europe because he saw them as an effective form of rule that created a more equal society and thus creating a more friendly relationship between the ruling class and the rest of the peoples of Europe.

The Corpus Juris Civilis was translated into French, German, Italian, and Spanish in the 19th century. However, no English translation of the entire Corpus Juris Civilis existed until 1932 when Samuel Parsons Scott published his version The Civil Law. Scott did not base his translation on the best available Latin versions, and his work was severely criticized.Fred. H. Blume used the best-regarded Latin editions for his translations of the Code and of the Novels. A new English translation of the Code, based on Blume's, was published in October 2016. In 2018, the Cambridge University Press also published a new English translation of the Novels, based primarily on the Greek text.

See also

 Frederick Barbarossa
 Basilika
 Byzantine law
 Code of Hammurabi
 Codex Repetitae Praelectionis
 Corpus Juris Canonici
 Henry de Bracton
 Dušan's Code
 International Roman Law Moot Court
 List of Roman laws
 Twelve Tables
 Zakonopravilo

References

External links
 Corpus Juris Civilis – World History Encyclopedia
 BBC In Our Time podcast 'Justinian's Legal Code' 
 Justinian's Code by Fred H. Blume

Latin texts

Corpus Iuris Civilis complete
 Corpus Iuris Civilis Mommsen and Krueger edition; photographically reproduced
 Corpus Iuris Civilis Lion, Hugues de la Porte, 1558–1560: photographically reproduced
 Digestum vetus
 Infortiatum
 Digestum novum
 Codex
 Volumen parvum
 The Roman Law Library Including Corpus Iuris Civilis, Mommsen and Krueger edition; digitised

Institutiones, Codex and Digesta
 Latin Law Library Text (edition unstated); digitised

English translations

Corpus Iuris Civilis complete
 The Civil Law English translation (from Latin editions earlier than that of Mommsen and Krueger) by S.P. Scott, 1932

Codex
 The Justinian Code In S.P. Scott's translation (see previous); digitised
 Information on the Justinian Code and its manuscript tradition on the  website, A database on Carolingian secular law texts (Karl Ubl, Cologne University, Germany).
 Bruce W. Frier, ed. (2016, The Codex of Justinian. A New Annotated Translation, with Parallel Latin and Greek Text, Cambridge University Press, p. 2963, .

Novellae
David J.D. Miller & Peter Saaris, The Novels of Justinian: A Complete Annotated English Translation Cambridge University Press, p. 1192,  Codex and Novellae''
 Annotated Justinian Code English translation (from the Mommsen and Krueger edition) by Fred H. Blume, 1943; revised by Timothy Kearley, 2005–2009 (greatly preferable to Scott's translation).

Selections
 Selected Laws of Justinian Internet Medieval Sourcebook

Roman law
Byzantine law
Defunct constitutions
Medieval legal codes
Roman law codes
Justinian I
6th century in law
6th-century Latin books
6th century in the Byzantine Empire
Latin prose texts